The 2012–13 season was AS Monaco FC's second season in Ligue 2 since relegation from Ligue 1 in 2011. Claudio Ranieri takes over as manager of AS Monaco, following the sacking of Marco Simone at the end of the previous season.

Season review

Squad
Updated 1 February 2013.

Reserve Team

On loan

Transfers

Summer

In:

 

 
 

 

Out:

Winter

In:

 
 
 

Out:

Competitions

Friendlies

Ligue 2

League table

Results summary

Results by round

Results

Coupe de la Ligue

Coupe de France

Squad statistics

Appearances and goals

|-
|colspan="14"|Players away from the club on loan:

|-
|colspan="14"|Players who appeared for Monaco no longer at the club:

|}

Top scorers

Disciplinary record

References

External links
 2012–13 AS Monaco FC season at ESPN
2012–13 AS Monaco FC season at Soccerway

AS Monaco FC seasons
Monaco
AS Monaco
AS Monaco